Beşiktaş Women's Football is the women football section of Beşiktaş JK, a major sports club in Istanbul, Turkey. From 2021 on, the team has been sponsored by the mobile phone company Vodafone Turkey.

History 
In the 2014–15 season, Beşiktaş women's team was allocated to the bottom league, the Turkish Women's Third Football League. They finished the league as the division leader, and after play-offs, they were promoted to the Women's Second League.

In the 2015–16 season, the team played in the Women's Second League, and secured promotion to the First League already four matches before the season's finish. They became league champion two matches prior to the end of the league. The team completed the 2015–16 season undefeated, and were promoted to the Turkish Women's First Football League.

The team finished the regular season of 2017–18 even on points with Konak Belediyespor behind the champion Ataşehir Belediyespor. The regular time of the play-off match between the two teams ended with 1–1 draw. In the extension time , Beşiktaş J.K. scored three penalty goals, finished the match by 4–1, and became runners-up.

Beşiktaş J.K. finished the 2018–19 Women's First League season as leader equal on points with ALG Spor with goal average that happened only in the last round. ALG Spor was leading with goal average in the previous two rounds. ALG Spor won their last match with 5-1, Beşiktaş J.K. defeated their opponent by 9-0, which enabled them a goal average of four in the final. The Turkish Football Federation set a play-off round between the two teams to be played on 12 May 2019 at a neutral venue, in Manavgat, Antalya. The team became for the first tine Women's First League champion after defeating ALG Spor in the play-off match with 1-0.

By the end of July 2019, the club transferred Kader Hançar, Sevgi Çınar, Sevgi Salmanlı and Yağmur Uraz, the four most experienced forwarders of the Women's football in Turkey,, three of them are former top scorers, for the 2019–20 UEFA Women's Champions League - Group 9 matches. The team finished the qualifying round's group matches undefeated with two draws and one win ranking second behind the Dutch Twente, who progressed to the round of 32 as the only team of the group.

In 2021, the mobile phone company Vodafone Turkey started sponsoring the women's team. Beşiktaş J.K. won in the 2020-21 Turkcell Women's Football League season their second champion title defeating Fatih Vatan Spor in the play-off  final game.

Stadium 

Beşiktaş JK women's team play their home matches at Fulya Hakkı Yeten Stadium of the Beşiktaş J.K. in Şişli district of Istanbul. The team played their home matches until the end of the 2018-19 Women's First League  season at İsmet İnönü Stadium, formerly Çilekli Stadium, of Beşiktaş Municipality, in Beşiktaş district.

Statistics 
.

 (1): Season discontinue due to COVID-19 pandemic in Turkey
 (2): Finish Gr. A as second, placed 4th after play-offs
 (3): Season in progress

Players

Current squad 
.
Head coach:  Suat Okyar

Former players 
 Former Turkish international and foreign players:
: Derya Arhan, Ayşe Şevval Ay, Çiğdem Belci, Dilek Enli, Emine Ecem Esen, Fatma Kara, Elif Keskin, Safa Merve Nalçacı, Ceren Nurlu, Melike Öztürk,  Sevgi Salman, Gamze Nur Yaman, Berna Yeniçeri

: Bilge Su Koyun
: Gi Santos 
: Jacquette Ada
: Ioanna Chamalidou
: Maryam Yektaei
: Ines Nrehy
: Eli Jakovska
: Aissata Traoré
: Imane Abdelahad, Chirine Knaidil
: Ekaterina Ulasevich
 Jessica Lynne Çarmıklı

International results

Honours 
 Turkish Women's First Football League
 Champions (2): 2018–19, 2020–21  
Runners-up (2): 2016–17, 2017–18
 Turkish Women's Second Football League
 Champions (1): 2015–16
 Turkish Women's Third Football League
 Champions (1): 2014–15

Kit history

Squad history

References

External links
 Beşiktaş Jimnastik Kulübü Home Page

Beşiktaş Football
Women's football clubs in Turkey
Association football clubs established in 1903
Association football clubs established in 2014
1903 establishments in the Ottoman Empire
2014 establishments in Turkey
Football clubs in Istanbul